Yves Camus (born 13 May 1930) is a French former sprinter who competed in the 1952 Summer Olympics and in the 1956 Summer Olympics.

References

External links

1930 births
Possibly living people
French male sprinters
Olympic athletes of France
Athletes (track and field) at the 1952 Summer Olympics
Athletes (track and field) at the 1956 Summer Olympics